Batán Grande is a national park 40 km north east of Chiclayo, in Pitipo District, Ferreñafe Province, of Lambayeque Region of Peru. Primarily the park protects the ancient city of Poma founded by the Lambayeque culture around 800 C.E. This archaeological site was extensively looted throughout the 20th century.  The park was established on 16 October 1991 and has a surface area of 134 km2.

The Sican Culture developed between 700 and 1350 on the north coast of Peru. The Lambayeque were a subdivision of the Sican, and appear first in the Batán Grande area.

Before the discovery of the city of Poma, Batán Grande was a farm raising sugar cane.

Reserved zones of Peru
Geography of Lambayeque Region